is a railway station in the city of Ichinoseki, Japan, operated by East Japan Railway Company (JR East).

Lines
Yushima Station is served by the Tōhoku Main Line, and is located 427.0 rail kilometers from the terminus of the line at Tokyo Station.

Station layout
The station has two opposed side platforms connected to the station building by a footbridge.  The platforms are not numbered. The station is unattended.

Platforms

History
Yushima Station opened on 1 July 1954. The station was absorbed into the JR East network upon the privatization of the Japanese National Railways (JNR) on 1 April 1987. Much of the station platform collapsed during the 2011 Tōhoku earthquake and was rebuilt by March 2012.

See also
 List of Railway Stations in Japan

References

External links

  

Railway stations in Iwate Prefecture
Tōhoku Main Line
Railway stations in Japan opened in 1954
Ichinoseki, Iwate
Stations of East Japan Railway Company